Paulo Roberto Cotechiño centravanti di sfondamento (Lady Football) is a 1983 Italian comedy film written and directed by Nando Cicero and starring Alvaro Vitali.

Plot
In Italy in the early 1980s, a Brazilian football ace (an idol for the Naples fans) is afflicted by nostalgia for his country and for his beautiful girlfriend.

Cast 

Alvaro Vitali as Paulo Roberto Cotechiño
Carmen Russo as  Lucelia
Mario Carotenuto as Uncle Mario
Cristiano Censi as Marzotti
Vittorio Marsiglia as Peppino Mergellina
Bobby Rhodes as Mandingo
Tiberio Murgia as Head of Brigades
Franca Valeri as  Countess
Gian Carlo Fusco as  Trombetti
Enzo Andronico as  Tancredi Cafiero
Moana Pozzi as Cotechino's Wooer 
Alfonso Tomas as Referee

Release
The film was released in Italy on September 2, 1983.

See also
 List of Italian films of 1983

References

External links

1983 films
Italian sports comedy films
1980s sports comedy films
Films set in Rome
Films shot in Rome
Italian association football films
Films directed by Nando Cicero
1980s Italian-language films
1980s Italian films